"Anyway" is the seventh official single and first single from The Platinum Edition of American soul singer CeeLo Green's third studio album, The Lady Killer. The single was released via digital download on December 11, 2011. The lyric video for the song was premiered on November 8, 2011 through Cee Lo Green's official YouTube channel.

Background
The song will be released as part of The Platinum Edition of The Lady Killer, which contains a total of seventeen tracks. It was written by Green alongside Eric Frederic, Ross Golan, Rivers Cuomo and Josh Alexander and produced by Wallpaper and Daniel Ledinsky. "Anyway" will be released alongside three other previously unreleased songs in the UK.

Music video
The official music video was released on November 24, 2011, and features bright lights and scantily-clad dancers.

Track listing
Digital Download
 "Anyway" (Explicit Version) - 3:34
 "Bright Lights, Bigger City" (BBC Radio 1 Live Lounge Session) - 3:46
 "Inhaler" (BBC Radio 1 Live Lounge Session) - 3:12
 "Anyway" (Rhythm Shed Remix) - 3:45

UK Promotional CD Single
 "Anyway" (Clean Version) - 3:33
 "Anyway" (Instrumental Version) - 3:33

Credits and personnel
Lead vocals – Cee Lo Green
Producers – Fraser T Smith
Lyrics – Callaway, Fraser T Smith, Rick Nowels
Label: Elektra Records

Charts

Release history

References

2011 singles
CeeLo Green songs
Songs written by CeeLo Green
Songs written by Rivers Cuomo
Songs written by Josh Alexander
2010 songs
Elektra Records singles
Songs written by Ross Golan
Songs written by Ricky Reed